KBQL (92.7 FM) is a radio station licensed to Las Vegas, New Mexico, United States. The station is currently owned by Matias C. Martinez and Martha Martinez, through licensee Sangre de Cristo Broadcasting Co., Inc.

References

External links

BQL
Radio stations established in 2009